Speed Wings is a 1934 American Pre-Code action film directed by Otto Brower and starring Tim McCoy, Evalyn Knapp, and William Bakewell.

References

External links
Speed Wings, imdb.com

1934 films
American action films
1930s action films
Films directed by Otto Brower
American black-and-white films
Columbia Pictures films
1930s American films